John Curtiss may refer to:
 John Curtiss (Royal Air Force officer)
 John Curtiss (baseball), American baseball pitcher
 John Shelton Curtiss, American historian of Russia

See also
 John Curtis (disambiguation)